Audrey Bergner (in Hebrew אודרי בֶּרגנֶר) (May 1927 - 9 May 2022) was an Australian-born Israeli artist.

Biography 
Audrey Bergner was born in Sydney and grew up in Melbourne. In 1950, she immigrated to Israel with her partner, the artist Yosl Bergner. They initially settled in Kibbutz Gvat, but left the kibbutz for Tel Aviv. After her marriage to Bergner, they moved to Safed. In the 1960s, they returned to Tel Aviv.

Bergner's themes are nature and Israel's Bedouin minority. She has illustrated books and created theater backdrops and costumes for a number of plays, among them Itzik Manger's Megilla Lieder (1965) and Hanoch Levin's Neurei Vardaleh (1974). She worked with playwright and theater director Nissim Aloni on Doda Liza (1969), performed by Habima, and Sa'ir Ehad La'azazel (1973) and Tzayia Yatza Latzud Batzad (1979), mounted by the Cameri Theater. Bergner lived in Tel Aviv-Yafo.
She died on 9 May 2022 and was buried in Kibbutz Einat cemetery.

Audrey Bergner's works can be found in public spaces including "Characters in the Desert" from 1983, displayed on Mount Scopus Campus while another of the series is displayed in the General Reading Room of the National Library in 
Jerusalem.

Gallery

Education 
 1943–1948 National Gallery of Victoria Art School, Melbourne, Australia.

Solo exhibitions 
 1949 The Assembly Hall, Melbourne, Australia
 1952 Katz Gallery, Tel Aviv-Yafo
 1956 Bezalel National Museum, Jerusalem
 1956 Museum of Modern Art, Haifa
 1963 Beit Zvi, Ramat Gan
 1966 Bineth Gallery, Jerusalem
 1967 Negev Museum, Jerusalem
 1969 Bineth Gallery, Jerusalem
 1971 Zuri Gallery, Neve Magen
 1976 Givon Fine Art, Tel Aviv-Yafo
 1979 Asaf Gallery, Tel Aviv-Yafo
 1980 Watercolors, Gordon Gallery, Tel Aviv-Yafo
 1982 Paintings 1980–82, Gordon Gallery, Tel Aviv-Yafo
 1984 Travel Notes, Zvi Noam Gallery, Tel Aviv-Yafo
 1985 Watercolors, Armadale Galleries, Melbourne, Australia
 1987 Paintings, Gould Galleries, Melbourne, Australia
 1988 Dvir Gallery, Tel Aviv-Yafo
 1989 Ayers Rock, Contemporary Art Gallery, Melbourne, Australia
 1990 Ayers Rock, Ephrat Gallery, Tel Aviv-Yafo
 1993 Deserts, Contemporary Art Gallery, Melbourne, Australia
 1996 People Walking, Gordon Gallery, Tel Aviv-Yafo
 1996 "People Walking, Helengory Gallery, Melbourne, Australia
 2001 Time and the Thylacine, Span Galleries, Melbourne, Australia
 2003 Time and the Thylacine, Dan Gallery, Tel Aviv-Yafo
 2004 Birds, Span Galleries, Melbourne, Australia
 2007 Birds, Bernard Gallery, Tel Aviv-Yafo
 2013 Tall tales and Carpets and Shells, Hanina Contemporary Art, Tel Aviv-Yafo

See also 
 Visual arts in Israel

References

External links 
 
 
 

1927 births
2022 deaths
Artists from Tel Aviv
Israeli scenic designers
20th-century Israeli painters
20th-century Israeli women artists
Israeli women painters
Australian emigrants to Israel